Lita Spena (October 4, 1904-1989) was an Argentine composer, performer, and teacher who used Argentine folk tunes in her compositions.

Spena was born into a musical family in Buenos Aires. Her father, composer Lorenzo Spena, emigrated from Naples, Italy, to Buenos Aires in 1901. He founded the Clementi Conservatory and composed at least two operas.

Spena studied music with her parents as a child, then attended the Conservatorio Nacional Superior de Música Argentina, where she later taught. Her students included Ruben Ferrero and Waldo de los Rios. In 1929, she founded and began performing with the Argentine Trio. 

Spena used themes from Argentine folksongs in her compositions. She composed songs based on texts by German Berdiales, Alfredo R. Bufano, Julia Crespo, Andre Gide, Horacio Guillén, Jorge Jantus, Carlos Mingo,and Juan Vignale. Her compositions included:

Piano 

Preludios

Sonata

Theater 

Pinocchio (story by Carlo Collodi)

Vocal 
30 Children’s songs
Songs from Jujuy
Songs from Tulumaya
Songs of Love

Listen to works by Lita Spena

References 

Argentine composers
Argentine women composers
1904 births
1989 deaths
People from Buenos Aires